Robert Crants (born 1944) is an American businessman. He is a co-founder of the Corrections Corporation of America. He served as its chairman and chief executive officer from 1994 to 1999.

Early life
Doctor Robert Crants was born on November 17, 1944, in Salamanca, New York. His mother gave him the first name of "Doctor", but he has not generally used it as an adult. He is one quarter Seneca from his maternal side, and he grew up on a Seneca reservation in New York.

He was educated at Lansing Central High School. He graduated from the United States Military Academy in West Point, New York, where he was Thomas W. Beasley's roommate. He served in Vietnam and Southeast Asia. He received a master's degree in business administration and a law degree from the Harvard Business School in 1974.

Career
Crants served as chief financial officer of a real estate company in Nashville, Tennessee. Later, he founded Broadcast Management Services, and established several television stations.

In 1983, he co-founded Corrections Corporation of America with his former roommate, Thomas W. Beasley, by then a leader in the Republican Party in Tennessee, and T. Don Hutto, creating a private prison management company. CCA received initial investments from Jack C. Massey, the founder of Hospital Corporation of America, Vanderbilt University, the Tennessee Valley Authority.

He served as its treasurer. By 1987, Crants became its president. He served as its chairman and chief executive officer from 1994 to 1999. As of 2015, it is the largest prison management company in the nation. By 2016, Corrections Corporation of America (CCA) along with Geo Group were running "more than 170 prisons and detention centres". CCA's revenues in 2015 were $1.79bn.

Shortly after the September 11 attacks in 2001, Crants co-founded the Homeland Security Corporation with one of his sons, D. Robert Crants, III. Crants serves as its chief executive officer, while Joseph S. Johnson serves as president.

Personal life
Crants is married to Shirley Crants. They have two sons and a daughter.

References

Living people
1944 births
Seneca people
People from Cattaraugus County, New York
People from Nashville, Tennessee
United States Military Academy alumni
Harvard Business School alumni
American company founders
American chief executives
CoreCivic people